Tub Girls is a 1967 American avant garde film directed by Andy Warhol and starring Viva, one of the Warhol Superstars. The film features Viva sitting naked in a bathtub talking with other Factory regulars, including Brigid Berlin (credited as Brigid Polk). The original poster promoting this film, designed by George Abagnalo, is shown prominently in a portrait of Warhol by Jack Mitchell.

See also
List of American films of 1967
Andy Warhol filmography

References

External links

1967 films
Films directed by Andy Warhol
Films shot in New York City
American independent films
American avant-garde and experimental films
1960s English-language films
1960s American films